West Monroe High School is a high school in West Monroe, Louisiana, United States. It is administered by the Ouachita Parish School Board. WMHS is fully accredited by the Southern Association of Colleges and Schools.  The school's mascot is The Rebel Man.

History
In 2013, 87 percent of WMHS students who took the Advanced Placement test passed the examination, the highest rate in the state. Four thousand more students in Louisiana took the 2013 exam compared to the number doing so in 2012, the largest increase in participation of any state. Louisiana students taking the exam earned a collective 5,144 college credits, an increase of 25 percent over 2012.

In 2017 Andre Perry, previously the founding dean of the urban education division of Davenport University, wrote an article published in The Hechinger Report which criticized West Monroe for continuing to use the rebel mascot.

Extracurricular activities

Student Council
The West Monroe High School Student Council is one of the largest active clubs on campus. It boasts over 100 members per year.  The club is active on the state and regional level attending both state and regional conferences each year.  The Council has also held the title of District President in the past.

French Club
The West Monroe High School French Club competes at A.L.C.F.E.S. (Association Louisianaise des Clubs de Français des Écoles Secondaires) annually against the state's best public and private schools. Over the past few years, the club has done exceptionally well in theatre, media, and music. Five students (in 2014, 2015, 2018, 2019, and 2020) have competed and won scholarships to study abroad in Nova Scotia and Belgium.

Band
The band received consecutive Superior ratings at Marching and Concert festivals since 1966. The band consists of 200 students. In 2014, the band appeared in the London New Years Day Parade in Westminster, UK. The band has appeared in two Presidential Inaugural Parades, George W. Bush in 2005 and Donald Trump in 2017. The band was one of only 7 high school bands invited. The band has also been invited to the Louisiana Showcase of Marching Bands in 2014, 2015, 2016, 2017 and 2018. In those years, they placed 11th (2014), 6th (2015), 5th (2016), 9th (2017), and 3rd (2018,) in the state of Louisiana.

Choir
West Monroe High School's Rebel Choir has a total of about 120 students. It is an auditioned ensemble that performs at an advanced level. The choir is directed by Greg Oden. The choir has an unbroken streak of Superior Ratings beginning in 1994, and has toured Italy, Europe, and Austria. The students were also invited to sing at New York's Carnegie Hall in 1999, 2003, 2008, 2012, 2016, and 2020.

AFJROTC
In the 2015–2016 school year West Monroe's Air Force Junior ROTC was awarded the Distinguished Unit with Merit award recognizing the program for being in the top 10% of 878 AFJROTC programs located around the world.  Their Falcon Honor Guard was recognized as one of the best in the state at a statewide drill meet held in January 2016 at Louisiana Tech University. The AJFROTC program is led by Retired Lt. Col. Brain Buck and was named, instructor of the year worldwide. The accomplishments of LA-061 continue and live on forever at West Monroe High School

Junior Classical League 
West Monroe High School has an established chapter of the Junior Classical League that over a hundred students are involved in.

Athletics

West Monroe High athletics competes in the LHSAA.

Football
The school has won eight state championships and two national championships. The most recent state championship was in 2011 when they defeated Carencro (Lafayette) by a score of 20–13. The school has a fully outfitted football stadium named Rebel Stadium, which is mostly funded by the team's Rebel Booster Club. Artificial turf was installed on Don Shows Field in 2017.

Coaches 
 Don Shows - LHSAA Hall of Fame Head Coach, Don Shows, won seventeen district and eight state championships ('93, '96, '97, '98, '00, '05, '09, '11) and were state runners-up six times. His teams won two national championships in 1998 and 2000. Shows finished with a record of 345–78–0 and a .817 winning percentage at West Monroe, Pineville High School, Jonesboro-Hodge High School, and Farmerville High School.

Notable alumni

Tommy Banks (Class of 1997), medical doctor and former fullback for the LSU Tigers
Will Blackwell (Class of 2007), former professional football player
Chad Cook (Class of 2003), gridiron football player
Dillon Day, (Class of 2011) Green Bay Packers
Chuck Finley, Former MLB player (California Angels, Cleveland Indians, St. Louis Cardinals)
Bruce Fowler (Class of 1980), opera singer
Roderick Green (Class of 1997), Oklahoma Christian University basketball player, Paralympian 1999–present Volleyball and Track and Field, Amp1 basketball 2012–present, and six-time Paralympic and World Championship medalist
James Donald Halsell, Jr. (Class of 1974), NASA Astronaut
Haley Hayden, (Class of 2013), softball player
Dixon Hearne (Class of 1966), award-winning author
Michael Hunter,(Class of 2010), Denver Broncos
Dwayne Lathan (Class of 2007), former professional basketball player
Jaden Leach (Class of 2010), 2013 Miss Louisiana
Bradie James (Class of 1999), Dallas Cowboys & Houston Texans
Barkevious Mingo (Class of 2009), New England Patriots (Super Bowl Champion)
Cam Robinson (Class of 2014), Jacksonville Jaguars
Mike Smith (Class of 1997), former professional basketball player
Jerry Stovall (Class of 1958), All-American running back LSU, NFL Pro Bowls, head football coach for LSU
Paul Turner (Class of 2012) New England Patriots
Mike Walsworth(Class of 1974), Member of the Louisiana State Senate
Andrew Whitworth (Class of 2001), Cincinnati Bengals (2006–2016), Los Angeles Rams (2017–2021), Super Bowl Champion
Ralph Williams (Class of 1976), gridiron football player
Xavier Woods (Class of 2013), Dallas Cowboys
Andre Young , Louisiana Tech San Diego Chargers

Notable faculty
Steve Ensminger, offensive coordinator/quarterbacks coach at LSU, wide receiver coach in 2002
Justin Hill, head baseball coach at McNeese State, assistant baseball coach in 2003

See also
 List of high schools in Louisiana

References

External links
 Official Web Site
 WMHS Band official site
 Ouachita Parish School Board

Schools in Ouachita Parish, Louisiana
Public high schools in Louisiana
1953 establishments in Louisiana
Educational institutions established in 1953